R136a2 (RMC 136a2) is a Wolf-Rayet star residing near the center of the R136, the central concentration of stars of the large NGC 2070 open cluster in the Tarantula Nebula, a massive H II region in the Large Magellanic Cloud which is a nearby satellite galaxy of the Milky Way.

Discovery
In 1960, a group of astronomers working at the Radcliffe Observatory in Pretoria made systematic measurements of the brightness and spectra of bright stars in the Large Magellanic Cloud. Among the objects cataloged was RMC 136, (Radcliffe Observatory Magellanic Cloud Catalogue, Catalog number 136) the central "star" of 30 Doradus.  Subsequent observations showed that R136 was located in the center of a giant H II region that was a center of intense star formation in the immediate vicinity of the observed stars.

In the early 1980s, R136a was first resolved using speckle interferometry into 8 components. R136a2 was marginally the second brightest found within 1 arc-second at the centre of the R136 cluster.  Previous estimates that the brightness of the central region would require as many as 30 hot O class stars within half a parsec at the centre of the cluster had led to speculation that a star several thousand times the mass of the sun was the more likely explanation. Instead it was eventually found that it consisted of a few extremely luminous stars accompanied by a larger number of hot O stars.

Distance

Determining a precise distance to R136a2 is challenging due to many factors. At the immense distance to the LMC, the parallax method is beyond the limits of current technology. Most estimates assume that R136 is at the same distance as the Large Magellanic Cloud.  The most accurate distance to the LMC is 49.97 kpc, derived from a comparison of the angular and linear dimensions of eclipsing binary stars.

Properties
Like all Wolf-Rayet stars, R136a2 is undergoing severe mass loss by a fast stellar wind. The fusion rate is so great that in 10 seconds R136a2 produces more energy than the Sun does in a year.

Because of the high temperature, it emits most of its energy in the ultraviolet region of the electromagnetic spectrum, and the visual brightness is only 114,000 times the sun (MV −7.80).

Fate

It is thought that stars this massive can never lose enough mass to avoid a catastrophic end with the collapse of a large iron core.  The result will be a supernova, hypernova, gamma-ray burst, or perhaps almost no visible explosion, and leaving behind a black hole.  The exact details depend heavily on the timing and amount of mass loss, with current models not fully reproducing the distribution of stars and supernovae that we observe.  The most massive stars in the local universe are expected to progress to hydrogen-free Wolf Rayet stars before their cores collapse, producing a type Ib or Ic supernova and leaving behind a black hole. Gamma ray bursts are only expected under unusual conditions, or for less massive stars.

References

External links
 http://www.eso.org/public/news/eso1030/

Stars in the Large Magellanic Cloud
Tarantula Nebula
Wolf–Rayet stars
Extragalactic stars
?
Dorado (constellation)
Large Magellanic Cloud